Partner is a Bengali film Directed  by Shankar Ray.

Plot
Partner is all about a funny and dangerous contract between two haggards Dasu and Ayan (Jeet). The two met at the Sealdah North Railway Tracks while arriving for suicide at the same time. While Dasu (Santu Mukhopadhyay) realising his faults, Ayan (Jeet) remains bent on ending his life. Dasu is a rich man turned poor (after his only son's death) who is constantly truncated by debtors while Ayan is a frustrated rich brat who is devastated after crushing in his business (share and stocks) and being betrayed by his girlfriend Rina. Dasu convinces Ayan not to commit suicide at the heat of the moment when Ayan still insists to die Dasu sorts out a peculiar contract between themselves. He begs Ayan to die exactly after three months. This is because Dasu, who is a part-time insurance agent, wants Ayan to buy a life insurance policy which would mature after three months. Dasu, meanwhile would pay the premium of 10 thousand rupees by any means whatsoever and after three months when Ayan would commit suicide Dasu would get the entire value of the insurance policy (Rs. 10 lacs) as Ayan's only nominee. Ayan evaluates Dasu's proposal and thinks to make some penance for his sins before his death. Ayan starts living in Dasu's residence for the next three months. Meanwhile, Ayan falls in love with Dasu's only daughter Priya (Swastika Mukherjee) and Ayan's father Ramen Roy appoints his brother-in-law Gobordhan Ghoshal (private investigator, played by Kharaj Mukherjee) to find his missing son. After much fun, frolic and confusion, Ayan is barred by Dasu from committing suicide. Dasu's debts are cleared by the hearty Romen Roy while Ayan marries Priya.

Cast
 Jeet as Ayan Roy
 Swastika Mukherjee as Priya Bhattacharya
 Arpita Mukherjee as Rina
 Santu Mukhopadhyay as Dasu Bhattacharya
 Deepankar De as Ramen Roy
 Anamika Saha as Mrs. Roy
 Kharaj Mukherjee as Gobardhan Ghosal
 Kanchan Mullick as Keshta
 Nimu Bhowmik as Moni Jyotishi
 Sharmistha Nath

Soundtrack

The album is composed by Ashok Raaj for Partner.

References

2008 films
Bengali-language Indian films
Remakes of Indian films
2000s Bengali-language films